Yamini Jadhav is a Shiv Sena politician from Mumbai, Maharashtra. 
She is current Member of Legislative Assembly from  Byculla Vidhan Sabha constituency  as a member of Shiv Sena.

Positions held
 2012: Elected as corporator in Brihanmumbai Municipal Corporation
 2019: Elected to Maharashtra Legislative Assembly

References

External links
  Shivsena Home Page 

Shiv Sena politicians
Year of birth missing (living people)
Living people
Maharashtra MLAs 2019–2024